is a 1959 Japanese war film directed by Shūe Matsubayashi, with special effects by Eiji Tsuburaya.

Plot

During World War II, the commanding officer of a sub reluctantly takes on board two Western diplomats to take them to the Canaries and arrange an armistice. When they get there, Japan has surrendered, but the sub's crew do not know that since its radio has failed. It sends its passengers ashore to go out to face a final battle.

Cast
 Ryō Ikebe
 Tatsuya Mihashi
 Akihiko Hirata
 Akira Kubo
 Susumu Fujita
 Minoru Takada
 Maria Laurenti
 Andrew Hughes
 Hisaya Ito

See also 
 Imperial Japanese Navy submarines
 B3 type submarine

References

 Ragone, August (2007, 2014) Eiji Tsuburaya: Master of Monsters San Francisco, CA: Chronicle Books. .

External links

1959 films
Films directed by Shūe Matsubayashi
1950s Japanese-language films
Japanese war films
World War II submarine films
Japanese World War II films
1950s Japanese films